My Song for You may refer to:


Film
My Song for You (film), a 1934 film

Music

Albums
My Song For You, a 1969 album by the Mercey Brothers
My Song For You, a 2009 album by Mai Fukui

Songs
"My Song For You", a 1957 song by Polish tenor Jan Kiepura from the movie of the same name
"My Song For You", a 1970 song by the Mercey Brothers
"My Song for You", a 1974 song by Vicky Leandros
"My Song for You", a 1982 song by Amii Ozaki
"My Song For You", a 2005 song by Keith Martin from the album I'm Not Alone
"My Song For You", a 2008 song by Amanda Sommerville from the album Windows
"My Song for You" (Demi Lovato and Joe Jonas song), 2010